L-vocalization, in linguistics, is a process by which a lateral approximant sound such as , or, perhaps more often, velarized , is replaced by a vowel or a semivowel.

Types
There are two types of l-vocalization:
 A labiovelar approximant, velar approximant, or back vowel:  >  or  >  or 
 A front vowel or palatal approximant:  >  >

West Germanic languages
Examples of L-vocalization can be found in many West Germanic languages, including English, Scots, Dutch, and some German dialects.

Early Modern English

L-vocalization has occurred, since Early Modern English, in certain -al- and -ol- sequences before coronal or velar consonants, or at the end of a word or morpheme.

At the end of a word or morpheme, it  produced all, ball, call, control, droll, extol, fall, gall, hall, knoll, mall, pall, poll, roll, scroll, small, squall, stall, stroll, swollen, tall, thrall, toll, troll and wall. The word shall did not follow this trend, and remains  today.

Before coronal consonants, it produced Alderney, alter, bald, balderdash, bold, cold, false, falter, fold, gold, halt, hold, malt, molten, mould/mold, old, palsy, salt, shoulder (earlier sholder), smolder, told, wald, Walter and wold (in the sense of "tract of land").  As with shall, the word shalt did not follow the trend and remains  today.

Before , it produced balk, caulk/calk, chalk, Dundalk, falcon, folk, Polk, stalk, talk, walk and yolk.

Words like fault and vault did not undergo L-vocalization but rather L-restoration. The word falcon existed simultaneously as homonyms fauco(u)n and falcon in Middle English. The word moult/molt never originally had  to begin with and instead derived from Middle English mout and related etymologically to mutate; the  joined the word intrusively.

L-vocalization established a pattern that would influence the spelling pronunciations of some relatively more recent loanwords like Balt, Malta, polder, waltz and Yalta. It also influenced English spelling reform efforts, explaining the American English mold and molt as opposed to the traditional mould and moult.

However, certain words of more recent origin or coining do not exhibit the change and retain short vowels, including Al, alcohol, bal, Cal, calcium, doll, gal, Hal, mal-, Moll, pal, Poll, Sal, talc, and Val.

While in most circumstances L-vocalization stopped there, it continued in -alk and -olk words, with the  disappearing entirely in most accents (with the notable exception of Hiberno-English). Even outside Ireland, some of these words have more than one pronunciation that retains the  sound, especially in American English where spelling pronunciations caused partial or full reversal of L-vocalization in a handful of cases:

Modern English
The resulting sound may not always be rounded. The precise phonetic quality varies. It can be heard occasionally in the dialect of the English East Midlands, where words ending in -old can be pronounced . K. M. Petyt (1985) noted this feature in the traditional dialect of West Yorkshire but said it has died out. However, in recent decades, l-vocalization has been spreading outwards from London and the southeast; John C. Wells argued that it is probable that it will become the standard pronunciation in England over the next one hundred years, which Petyt criticised in a book review.

Graham Shorrocks noted extensive L-vocalisation in the dialect of Bolton, Greater Manchester, and commented, "many, perhaps, associate such a quality more with Southern dialects, than with Lancashire/Greater Manchester."

In Plymouth L-vocalisation is also found, but without turning into the Bristol L afterwards.

African-American English dialects may have L-vocalization as well.  However, in these dialects, it may be omitted altogether: fool becomes . Some English speakers from San Francisco, particularly those of Asian ancestry, also vocalize or omit .

German
In colloquial varieties of modern standard German, including the northern Missingsch, there is a moderate tendency to vocalise coda  into , especially in casual speech. This is most commonly found before  in words like welche ("which") or solche ("such"), which merges with Seuche ("disease"). To a lesser degree, the same may also occur before other dorsal and labial consonants.

A similar but far more regular development exists in many dialects of Austro-Bavarian, including Munich and Vienna.

In most varieties of the Bernese dialect of Swiss German, historical  in coda position has become  and historical  (only occurring intervocalically) has become , whereas intervocalic  persists. The absence of vocalization was one of the distinctive features of the now-uncommon upper-class variety. It is still missing from dialects spoken in the Bernese Highlands and, historically, in the Schwarzenburg area. For example, the Bernese German name of the city of Biel is pronounced .

Middle Scots

Middle Dutch

In early Middle Dutch,  and  merged and vocalised to  before a dental consonant ( or ):
  "old" < 
  "wood" < 
 , a name < 
  "gold", but  "golden"
  "sheriff", but  "guilt, debt"
  "would" < , past tense of  "to will, shall"
  "to hold", past tense 
  "wanted" < wolden, past tense of  "to want"
Analogy has caused it to be restored in some cases, however:
  reformed next to older 
  "to apply", past tense , earlier gouden

Modern Dutch
Many speakers of the northern accents of Dutch realize  in the syllable coda as a strongly pharyngealized vowel .

Romance languages

French

between a vowel and a consonant, as in Vulgar Latin  "warm, hot" > Old French  
after a vowel at the end of a word, as in Vulgar Latin  > Old French  > Old French   "beautiful" (masculine singular; compare the feminine  , in which the  occurred between vowels and did not vocalize)

By another sound change, diphthongs resulting from L-vocalization were simplified to monophthongs:
Modern French  
Modern French  

Italo-Romance languages

In early Italian,  vocalized between a preceding consonant and a following vowel to : Latin  > Italian , Latin  > Italian .

For example, vulgar Latin  > ;  > ;  >  (with diminutive suffix). In many areas the vocalized  has evolved further into a syllabic , thus , .

Ibero-Romance languages

In Portuguese, historical  ( in the syllable coda) has become  for most Brazilian dialects, and it is common in rural communities of Alto Minho and Madeira. The pair is distinguished only by the antonyms ( ~ and  ~).

Slavic languages

South Slavic languages
In Standard Serbo-Croatian, historical  in coda position has become  and is now so spelled at all times in Serbian and most often in Croatian. This does not apply to adjectives or past participles of verbs, which are the same in Standard Croatian as in Standard Serbian.

Polish and Sorbian

In Polish and Sorbian languages, almost all historical  have become , even in word-initial and inter-vocalic positions. The  pronunciation, called wałczenie in Polish, dates back to the 16th century, first appearing among the lower classes. It was considered an uncultured accent until the mid-20th century, when the stigma gradually began to fade. As of the 21st century,  is still used by some speakers of eastern Polish dialects, especially in Belarus and Lithuania, as well as in Polish-Czech and Polish-Slovak contact dialects in southern Poland.

Ukrainian and Belarusian
The same happens in the past tense of verbs: Russian  , Ukrainian  , Belarusian   "gave". The  is kept at the end of nouns (Russian and Belarusian  , Ukrainian   "table") and before suffixes (before historical  in the word middle): Russian, Ukrainian, and Belarusian   "stick".

Uralic languages
Proto-Uralic *l was vocalized to *j in several positions in the Proto-Samoyed language. Several modern Uralic languages also exhibit l-vocalization:
 In Hungarian, former palatal lateral  (still written by a separate grapheme ) has become a semivowel .

See also
 Ł–l merger
 Regional accents of English
 Ł
 Elmer Fudd
 Tweety

References
Labov, William, Sharon Ash, and Charles Boberg. 2006. The Atlas of North American English. Berlin: Mouton de Gruyter. .

External links
Transcribing Estuary English, by J. C. Wells - discusses the phonetics of l-vocalization in Estuary English and Cockney.

English phonology
Dialects of English
Splits and mergers in English phonology
American English